Political prisoners in Imperial Japan were detained and prosecuted by the government of the Empire of Japan for dissent, attempting to change the national character of Japan, Communist activity, or association with a group whose stated aims included the aforementioned goals. Following the dissolution of the Empire of Japan after World War II, all remaining political prisoners were released by policies issued under the Allied occupation of Japan.

Meiji period – Shōwa period

Beginning in the Meiji period, the government of the Empire of Japan detained Japanese residents suspected of political dissidence.

In 1925, the Peace Preservation Law was passed. Article 1 of the law stipulates that: "Anyone who organises an association with the objective of change the kokutai or denying the private property system, or who joins such an association with full knowledge of its objectives, shall be liable to imprisonment with or without hard labour for a term not exceeding ten years."

Only about 5,000 out of more than 74,000 suspected violators of the Peace Preservation Law between 1928 and 1941 were prosecuted.

Those who recanted were either released or received short prison terms.

On 4 October 1945, the GHQ issued the Removal of Restrictions on Political, Civil, and Religious Liberties directive, which stipulated the release of political prisoners. It was estimated that 2,500 to 3,000 political prisoners were in prison by the end of the war. Following the release of political prisoners on 10 October 1945, the GHQ enacted the "Restoration of Electoral Rights to Released Political Prisoners."

Notable political prisoners
Shigeo Kamiyama
Shoichi Ichikawa
Kiyoshi Miki 
Jun Tosaka

Notable prisons
Sugamo Prison
Fuchu Prison

Memoirs
Eighteen Years in Prison (Gokuchu juhachi-nen) by Kyuichi Tokuda and Yoshio Shiga. Published by the Japanese Communist Party in 1948.

See also
Japanese dissidence during the Shōwa period
Political repression in Imperial Japan

References

Further reading
Milorad M. Drachkovitchy (1986). Biographical Dictionary of the Comintern. Hoover Press. .

External links

Japanese Resistance
Political repression in Japan
Political prisoners in former countries
Political prisoners in Japan